Alican Yücesoy (born 22 October 1982) is a Turkish actor, screenwriter and director. He is best known for films, theatre plays. In television career, He is best known for surreal series  Şubat, drama series "Kördüğüm", İntikam Turkish remake of "Revenge", medical series "Sen de Gitme" and supporting roles in popular series "Suskunlar", "Adanalı", "Zoraki Koca". He gained international recognition with his role in the Japanese-Turkish co-production 125 Years Memory.

Early life

His maternal family is of Turkish descent who immigrated from Bartın and Ruse where Turk minority in Bulgaria lives. His paternal family is of Arab and Turkish descents from Antep and Urfa.

After completing his primary, secondary and high school education in Bursa, Yücesoy enrolled in Haliç University Theatre Department for acting education. He started to work at Bakırköy Municipality Theatre after he participated in an audition the day after he entered the school. He later started appearing in TV series and movies. As of 2015, he is the new general art director of Bakırköy Municipality Theatre.

Theatre 
 He-Go: Halil Babür – Altıdan Sonra Theatre – 2017
 Gülünç Karanlık: Wolfram Lotz – Bakırköy Municipality Theatres – 2016
 Hayvan Çiftliği: George Orwell – Bakırköy Municipality Theatres – 2014
 Sıkı Yönetim: Albert Camus – Bakırköy Municipality Theatres – 2012
 Eksik: Özer Aslan – Tiyatro Hal – 2012
 Külhanbeyi Müzikali: Ülkü Ayvaz – Bakırköy Municipality Theatres – 2011
 Aklı Havada: Ali Yenel – Bakırköy Municipality Theatres – 2010
 Yağmurcu: N. Richard Nash – Bakırköy Municipality Theatres – 2008
 Tersine Dünya: Orhan Kemal – Bakırköy Municipality Theatres – 2007
 Dua Odası: Shan Khan – Tiyatro Z – 2006
 Pırtlatan Bal: Aziz Nesin – Bakırköy Municipality Theatres – 2005
 Günün Adamı: Haldun Taner – Bakırköy Municipality Theatres – 2005
 Teneke: Yaşar Kemal – Bakırköy Municipality Theatres – 2004
 Klakson, Borazanlar ve Bırtlar: Dari Fo – Bakırköy Municipality Theatres – 2004
 Köpek Kadın Erkek: Sibylle Berg – 2004
 Suret: Onur Bayraktar – Stüdyo Drama – 2004

Filmography

As director and screenwriter
Taş (short film)

As actor

Series

Film

Short film
 The Flag
 Cemil Show

TV programs
 2022 Maske Kimsin Sen? (Judge)

Awards 

 26th International Adana Golden Boll Film Festival – Best Actor Awards (2019) (Küçük Şeyler)
 56th Antalya Golden Orange Film Festival – Best Actor Awards (2019)
 The 33rd Montenegro Film Festival Golden Mimosa for Best Actor – La Belle Indifference
 9th Malatya International Film Festival – Best Actor Award
 7th Kayseri Film Festival – Best Actor Award (Küçük Şeyler)

References

External links 
 
 

1982 births
Male actors from Istanbul
Turkish male film actors
Turkish male television actors
21st-century Turkish male actors
Living people
Turkish people of Arab descent
Turkish people of Bulgarian descent